The Joining (J) chain is a protein component that links monomers of antibodies IgM and IgA to form polymeric antibodies capable of secretion.  The J chain is well conserved in the animal kingdom, but its specific functions are yet to be fully understood.  It is a 137 residue polypeptide, encoded by the IGJ gene.

Structure 

The J chain is a glycoprotein of molecular weight 15 kDa. Its secondary structure remains undetermined but is believed to adopt either a single β-barrel or two-domain folded structure with standard immunoglobulin domains. The J chain's primary structure is unusually acidic having a high content of negatively charged amino acids. It has 8 cysteine residues, 6 of which are involved in intramolecular disulfide bonds while the remaining two function to bind the Fc tailpiece regions of IgA or IgM antibodies, the α chain and μ chain respectively. An N-linked carbohydrate resulting from N-glycosylation is also essential in the protein's incorporation to antibody polymers. There is no known protein family with significant homology to the J chain.

Function

Antibody Polymerization 
The J chain regulates the multimerization of IgM and IgA in mammals. When expressed in cells, it favors the formation of a pentameric IgM and an IgA dimer.  IgM pentamers are most commonly found with a single J chain, but some studies have seen as many as 4 J chains associated to a single IgM pentamer.

The J chain is incorporated late in the formation of IgM polymers and thermodynamically favors the formation of pentamers as opposed to hexamers. In J chain-knockout (KO) mice, the hexameric IgM polymer dominates. These J chain negative IgM hexamers are 15-20 times more effective at activating complement than J chain positive IgM pentamers. However, J chain-KO mice have been shown have low concentrations of hexameric IgM and a deficiency in complement activation, suggesting additional in vivo regulatory mechanisms. Another consequence of pentameric IgM reduced complement activation is its allowance of J chain positive pIgM to bind antigen without causing excessive damage to epithelial membranes through complement activation. 

The J chain facilitates IgA dimerization by linking two monomer secretory tails. Structurally, the J chain joins two antibody monomers asymmetrically by forming intermolecular disulfide bonds and bringing hydrophobic β-sandwiches on each molecule together. This multimerization mechanism involves chaperone proteins including binding immunoglobulin protein (BiP) and MZB1 each sequentially recruiting distinct factors of the polymerized antibody.

Antibody Secretion 
Mucosal membrane antibody secretion from the basal membrane to apical epithelial cells is facilitated by the polymeric Ig receptor (pIgR). A basal protein of the pIgR known as secretory component (SC) recognizes Ig ready for secretion. The binding between the secretory component and secretory Ig is facilitated by the antibody's J chain which makes physical contact with the secretory component in order to change the transporter's conformation to an open state. The complex is then transcytosed and the secretory component proteolytically cleaved from the receptor releasing the antibody to the apical side of the epithelial cell and to the lumen at large. This mechanism is thought to be largely conserved between the secretion of IgM and IgA.

Regulation 
J chain was originally believed to only be expressed in antibody-secreting plasma cells, however, the J chain has been seen to be expressed in earlier stages of B cell differentiation prior to Ig expression. J chain expression is believed to occur in the early stages of lymphoid cell differentiation as it is expressed in both B and T cell precursors. As cells develop, it seems that expression of the μ-chain becomes necessary for J chain synthesis.

The J chain gene is transcriptionally regulated through canonical Pax5 repression. As Pax5 is a common transcriptional regulator, the J chain is still expressed in plasma cells that secrete monomeric antibodies. In such cells it is believed to provide no function and is quickly degraded. In plasma cells that secrete monomeric IgA, a Pax5-independent mechanism is likely to prevent IgA dimerization.

Phylogeny 
The J chain is likely to have evolutionarily arisen in early jaw-boned vertebrates. Groups of bony fish including teleosts have since lost J chain expression.  Xenopus are able to polymerize mucosal IgX in the absence of J chain, perhaps due to a loss of the conserved cysteine residues that link the J chain and Ig secretory tail.

Sharks do not express IgA and thus use J chain expression solely for the polymerization of IgM. This makes sharks an intriguing model organism in studying J chain regulation and polymerization without the confounding variables of mucosal secretion.

References

Further reading 

 
 
 
 
 
 
 
 
 
 
 
 
 
 
 
 

Proteins
Antibodies